The Canton of Le Marigot is a former canton in the Arrondissement of La Trinité on Martinique. It had 3,568 inhabitants (2012). It was disbanded in 2015. The canton comprised the commune of Le Marigot.

References

Cantons of Martinique